The 1916 United States House of Representatives elections in South Carolina were held on November 7, 1916 to select seven Representatives for two-year terms from the state of South Carolina.  The primary elections were held on August 29 and the runoff elections were held two weeks later on September 12.  Six incumbents were re-elected, but Wyatt Aiken of the 3rd congressional district was defeated in the Democratic primary.  The seat was retained by the Democrats and the composition of the state delegation remained solely Democratic.

1st congressional district
Incumbent Democratic Congressman Richard S. Whaley of the 1st congressional district, in office since 1913, defeated James G. Padgett in the Democratic primary and Republican J.O. Ladd in the general election.

Democratic primary

General election results

|-
| 
| colspan=5 |Democratic hold
|-

2nd congressional district
Incumbent Democratic Congressman James F. Byrnes of the 2nd congressional district, in office since 1911, defeated Alvin Etheredge in the Democratic primary and Republican Isaac Myers in the general election.

Democratic primary

General election results

|-
| 
| colspan=5 |Democratic hold
|-

3rd congressional district
Incumbent Democratic Congressman Wyatt Aiken of the 3rd congressional district, in office since 1903, was defeated in the Democratic primary by Frederick H. Dominick.  He was unopposed in the general election.

Democratic primary

General election results

|-
| 
| colspan=5 |Democratic hold
|-

4th congressional district
Incumbent Democratic Congressman Samuel J. Nicholls of the 4th congressional district, in office since 1915, won the Democratic primary and defeated Republican G.F. Mills in the general election.

Democratic primary

General election results

|-
| 
| colspan=5 |Democratic hold
|-

5th congressional district
Incumbent Democratic Congressman David E. Finley of the 5th congressional district, in office since 1899, defeated William F. Stevenson in the Democratic primary and was unopposed in the general election.

Democratic primary

General election results

|-
| 
| colspan=5 |Democratic hold
|-

6th congressional district
Incumbent Democratic Congressman J. Willard Ragsdale of the 6th congressional district, in office since 1913, won the Democratic primary and defeated Republican W.L. McFarlan in the general election.

Democratic primary

General election results

|-
| 
| colspan=5 |Democratic hold
|-

7th congressional district
Incumbent Democratic Congressman Asbury Francis Lever of the 7th congressional district, in office since 1901, defeated Republican challenger I.S. Leevy.

General election results

|-
| 
| colspan=5 |Democratic hold
|-

See also
United States House of Representatives elections, 1916
South Carolina gubernatorial election, 1916
South Carolina's congressional districts

References

"Report of the Secretary of State to the General Assembly of South Carolina.  Part II." Reports and Resolutions of the General Assembly of the State of South Carolina. Volume II. Columbia, SC: 1917, pp. 3–4.

South Carolina
1916
1916 South Carolina elections